T-Mobile Center (formerly Sprint Center) is a multi-purpose arena in downtown Kansas City, Missouri. It is located at the intersection of 14th Street and Grand Boulevard on the east side of the Power & Light District. It has effectively become the city's primary indoor arena, a role previously held by Kemper Arena, which had been built in 1974 a few miles away in the West Bottoms neighborhood.

History

The arena is owned by the city of Kansas City, Missouri. The final design was selected in August 2005, from the Downtown Arena Design Team, which was a collaboration of the architectural firms Populous, 360 Architecture, Rafael Architects, and Ellerbe Becket. The construction manager was M.A. Mortenson Company, based in Minneapolis, Minnesota.

The complete exterior glass façade system, all metal panels for the adjacent buildings and all accessory metal cladding, was custom designed, detailed, and supplied by Overgaard Ltd. Hong Kong to Architectural Wall Systems, the Des Moines, Iowa based glazing contractor who installed the building envelope. There are roughly 200 tons of system profiles and accessories. All of the 2,404 individual glass units on the main building were produced sequentially and completely assembled prior to shipping. The 5 million pounds of rebar was detailed, fabricated, and supplied by The Carter-Waters Corporation of Kansas City. The arena features a work of public art, The Moons, by Chris Doyle, commissioned by the Kansas City Municipal Arts Commission (KCMAC). The interior has a 360-degree LED video screen. The arena seats over 19,000 people and has 72 suites. Connected to its north side is the College Basketball Experience, which includes the National Collegiate Basketball Hall of Fame.

In early 2006, Anschutz Entertainment Group selected Brenda Tinnen to serve as the facility's general manager. She had previously served as senior vice president of the Staples Center in Los Angeles, and is widely credited with the initial success of the venue and for attracting top tier concert tours. Garth Brooks personally thanked her from the stage for luring him out of semi-retirement to play nine consecutive sold-out shows within a month of the venue opening. She responded by unveiling a "Championship Banner" in the rafters, to commemorate his achievement.

Sprint Center opened on October 10, 2007, inaugurated by an Elton John concert three days later.

In April 2020, T-Mobile US became the naming rights partner by completing a merger with Sprint Corporation. On July 9, 2020, Sprint Center was officially renamed to T-Mobile Center. Changes include an entrance specifically for T-Mobile customers, a lounge with tables that can charge smartphones wirelessly, charging stations all over the arena, T-Mobile 5G coverage, and a monument outside saying "Heart KC".

Gallery

Events
Since the arena's construction, various city officials of Kansas City have been in discussions with the National Hockey League (NHL) and the National Basketball Association (NBA) about possible expansion or relocation of a professional hockey and/or basketball franchise for the arena; however, neither league has yet approved a team to play in T-Mobile Center.

The arena hosted the Big 12 men's basketball tournament in 2008 and in every year since 2010. It hosted the first and second rounds of the 2009 and 2013 NCAA men's tournaments, plus the regional rounds of the 2017 NCAA men's tournament and 2019, and its scheduled to host it again in 2023. In 2010 and 2018 the Kansas City regional of the NCAA Women's Division I Basketball Tournament was held here.

The arena held Missouri's first UFC event for UFC on Fox: Johnson vs. Reis on April 15, 2017.

It hosted the former Kansas City Command of the Arena Football League (AFL).

The venue was a regular stop for the Professional Bull Riders (PBR)’s Premier Series for several years. Since 2022, it serves as the home venue of the PBR’s Kansas City Outlaws during the PBR Team Series season in the summer and autumn.

References

External links
 

T-Mobile US branded venue
Sprint Corporation
Sports venues in Kansas City, Missouri
Indoor arenas in Missouri
Basketball venues in Missouri
College volleyball venues in the United States
Gymnastics venues in the United States
Indoor ice hockey venues in Missouri
Indoor lacrosse venues in the United States
Indoor soccer venues in Missouri
Music venues in Missouri
Volleyball venues in the United States
Sports venues completed in 2007
2007 establishments in Missouri
Downtown Kansas City
Sports venues in Missouri
Deutsche Telekom